Jughan (also Romanized as Jūghān and Jowghān) is a village in Dehsard Rural District, in the Central District of Arzuiyeh County, Kerman Province, Iran. At the 2006 census, its population was 380, in 89 families.

References 

Populated places in Arzuiyeh County